Manakkale Thatha is a 1985 Indian Malayalam film, directed by Babu Korula and produced by Babu Korula. The film stars Nalinikanth, Jagathy Sreekumar, Rohini and Captain Raju in the lead roles. The film has musical score by A. T. Ummer.

Cast
Nalinikanth as Watchman
Jagathy Sreekumar as Sankara Narayanan Namboothiri
Rohini as Mini
Captain Raju as Investigator
Unnimary as Joly 
Kunchan
Oduvil Unnikrishnan as Damodhara Kurup
T. G. Ravi as Johnny
Kunchan as Investigator
Renuka

Soundtrack
The music was composed by A. T. Ummer and the lyrics were written by Bharanikkavu Sivakumar.

References

External links
 

1985 films
1980s Malayalam-language films